Razzano is a surname that may refer to:

Douglas Razzano (born 1988), American figure skater
José Razzano (1887-1960), Uruguayan singer and composer
Rick Razzano (linebacker) (born 1955), National Football League linebacker
Rick Razzano (disambiguation), multiple people
Virginie Razzano (born 1983), French tennis player
Massimiliano Razzano (born 1982), Italian physicist